The Second Session (Explanation) Act 1899 (63 Vict. Sess. 2 c.3), long title An Act to explain References in the Acts of the last Session of Parliament to the next ensuing Session, was an Act of Parliament of the Parliament of the United Kingdom, given the Royal Assent on 27 October 1899 and repealed in 1963.

It clarified that any Act passed in the preceding session of Parliament, which made reference to "the next session of Parliament", should be construed as references to the session beginning in the year 1900; this was intended to avoid any ambiguities caused by a second parliamentary session in the year 1899.

The Act was repealed by the Statute Law Revision Act 1963.

References
The public general acts passed in the sixty-third and sixty-third and sixty-fourth years of the reign of her majesty Queen Victoria. London: printed for Her Majesty's Stationery Office. 1900.
Chronological table of the statutes; HMSO, London. 1993.

United Kingdom Acts of Parliament 1899
Repealed United Kingdom Acts of Parliament